There are at least 42 named lakes and reservoirs in Chicot County, Arkansas.

Lakes
Archer Lake, el. 
Beaver Lake, el. 
Blue Bayou, el. 
Blue Hole Lake, el. 
Camp Lake, el. 
Camp Lake, el. 
Carolina Chute, el. 
Cocklebur Lake, el. 
Cornfield Chute, el. 
Cottonwood Chute, el. 
Dry Lake, el. 
Duck Lake, el. 
Eunice Chute, el. 
Grand Lake, el. 
Grassy Lake, el. 
Lafourche Lake, el. 
Lake Boggy Bayou, el. 
Lake Chicot, el. 
Lake Ferguson, el. 
Lake Lee, el. 
Lake Paradise, el. 
Lake Port, el. 
Leland Chute, el. 
Long Lake, el. 
Macon Lake, el. 
Moon Chute, el. 
Mud Lake, el. 
Muddy Lake, el. 
Otter Bayou, el. 
Otter Lake, el. 
Snag Lake, el. 
Snag Lake, el. 
Swan Pond, el. 
Whiskey Chute, el. 
Willow Lake, el. 
Willow Lake, el.

Reservoirs
Ball Lake, el. 
Ball Lake, el. 
Lake Chicot, el. 
Lake Paradise, el. 
Lake Wallace, el. 
Whiskey Chute Reservoir, el.

See also
 List of lakes in Arkansas

Notes

Bodies of water of Chicot County, Arkansas
Chicot